Jacqueline Margaret "Jackie" Court  (born 22 January 1950) is an English former cricketer who played as a right-handed batter and right-arm leg break bowler. She appeared in 17 Test matches and 23 One Day Internationals for England between 1976 and 1987. She also played 4 matches for Young England at the 1973 World Cup. She played domestic cricket for Middlesex.

Born in Willesden, Middlesex, she made her One Day International debut in the inaugural Women's World Cup in 1973 for Young England against Australia. She made her Test match debut against the same opposition at the Oval in 1976 and played her last test, again against Australia, at Hove in 1987. She scored 577 runs in total, with a highest score of  90 at an average of 20.60. She also took 8 test wickets. She played 27 One Day Internationals, scoring 397 runs at 23.35 with a top score of 67 and taking 16 wickets at 22.37.

References

External links

1950 births
England women Test cricketers
Living people
Middlesex women cricketers
People from Willesden
Young England women cricketers
England women One Day International cricketers